This Day and Age was a band from Tonawanda, a suburb of Buffalo, New York, signed to One Eleven Records.

History
This Day and Age formed in 2001, and released their debut full-length, Start Over on Monday, in 2002. They signed to One Eleven Records later in 2002. Their debut album, Always Leave the Ground, was released on the label in 2004. The release of the album was followed by tours with Mae and The Spill Canvas, as well as appearances on the Warped Tour. Soon after this, bassist Kenneth Campbell left the group and was replaced by Joey Secchiaroli. Shortly after the release of their 2006 album The Bell and the Hammer, it was announced that the band would be on hiatus as Jeff Martin went on to teach at a school called Renaissance Academy.  In late 2006, the remaining four members of the band announced that they would regroup in a new musical pursuit, now known as The Reign of Kindo.
Martin has since become a member of a new band, Pompton Lakes. Their debut album, "Rest," was released on iTunes and Amazon radio on October 30th, 2012, with a video for single, "Home," also released.

Members

Current members
 Jeff Martin – Vocals/Guitar
 Joseph Secchiaroli – Bass/Vocals 
 Steven Padin – Drums
 Kelly Sciandra – Piano
 Michael Carroll – Guitar

Former Members
 Kenneth Campbell – Bass (2003-2005)
 Peter Arcara – Bass (2001-2003; 2005)

Discography

Albums

References

External links
Official Website
Pure Volume site
This Day And Age official myspace
This Day And Age Profile on AbsolutePunk.net

Musical groups established in 2001
Musical groups from Buffalo, New York